IOF may refer to:

 Fraunhofer IOF, the Fraunhofer Institute for Applied Optics and Precision Engineering
 Independent Order of Foresters
 Infraorbital foramen, an opening in the skull under the eye socket
 Institute of Forestry, a forestry-related technical institute under Tribhuvan University, Nepal's largest academic institution
 Institute of Frescography, an institute for fresco and mural art
 Chartered Institute of Fundraising
 International Orienteering Federation
 International Osteoporosis Foundation, a global alliance of organizations concerned with osteoporosis and metabolic bone disease
 Israeli Occupation Forces, an unofficial name widely used in Palestine and among pro-Palestinian groups in reference to the Israel Defense Forces